José Amado García Gabriel (born 13 September 1977) is a Guatemalan long-distance runner who competed in the 2004 Summer Olympics, the 2008 Summer Olympics the 2012 Summer Olympics and the 2016 Summer Olympics.

Personal bests
 5000 m: 14:13.19 min –  Berkeley, California, 24 April 2010
 10,000 m: 28:50.25 min –  Palo Alto, California, 1 May 2010
 Half marathon: 1:04:20 hrs –  Warsaw, 18 June 2016
 Marathon: 2:14:27 hrs –  Rio de Janeiro, 29 Jul 2007

Achievements

References

External links
 

1977 births
Living people
Guatemalan male long-distance runners
Guatemalan male marathon runners
Olympic athletes of Guatemala
Athletes (track and field) at the 2004 Summer Olympics
Athletes (track and field) at the 2008 Summer Olympics
Athletes (track and field) at the 2012 Summer Olympics
Pan American Games silver medalists for Guatemala
Pan American Games medalists in athletics (track and field)
Athletes (track and field) at the 2003 Pan American Games
Athletes (track and field) at the 2007 Pan American Games
Athletes (track and field) at the 2011 Pan American Games
Athletes (track and field) at the 2015 Pan American Games
Central American and Caribbean Games gold medalists for Guatemala
People from Baja Verapaz Department
Central American Games gold medalists for Guatemala
Central American Games medalists in athletics
Central American Games silver medalists for Guatemala
Competitors at the 2002 Central American and Caribbean Games
Competitors at the 2006 Central American and Caribbean Games
Competitors at the 2010 Central American and Caribbean Games
Competitors at the 2014 Central American and Caribbean Games
Guatemalan male cross country runners
Central American and Caribbean Games medalists in athletics
Medalists at the 2007 Pan American Games
20th-century Guatemalan people
21st-century Guatemalan people